Jason Kimball Peterson (born November 1, 1981) is a media mogul, attorney, producer, entrepreneur, founder and chairman of GoDigital Media Group. In 2009, he was named one of the "Top 30 Entrepreneurs Under 30" by the Los Angeles Business Journal.  From 2017 to 2021, he was named as a "Top 40 under 40 Power Player" in music and home entertainment by both Billboard magazine and Media Play News, respectively.  From 2019 through 2022, he was named to Billboard's music industry "Indie Power Players List" and "Latin Power Players List" for managing Daddy Yankee's rights and buying Latino digital media company Mitú, respectively.

Peterson has worked with artists including Daddy Yankee, Janet Jackson, Jason Derulo, and T.I.

Jason has served as a director for major music distributor MERLIN as well as the American Association of Independent Music (A2iM), the Worldwide Independent Network (WIN), the Repertoire Data Exchange (RDx) a joint venture between WIN and IFPI creating a global recorded music data exchange, the Music Business Association, OTT.x the trade association for the home entertainment industry, and the Music, Film and Entertainment Executive Board at City of Hope Hospital in Los Angeles.

Peterson was an owner of Symbolic Entertainment, located in Marina del Rey, California, where he produced movies, commercials and music videos. At 19 years old he produced The Beat, which was shown at the Sundance Film Festival in 2003. Peterson earned his bachelor's degree from the Marshall School of Business at the University of Southern California (2004) and holds a J.D. from Pepperdine University School of Law (2007). He is an active member of the California Bar Association.

References 

1981 births
Chief executives in the media industry
Film producers from California
Businesspeople from Los Angeles
American web producers
UCLA Film School alumni
Living people
Marshall School of Business alumni
Pepperdine University School of Law alumni